Courtland Robert Mead (born April 19, 1987) is an American actor, noted for his performances on-screen during the 1990s.

Early life
Mead was born in Mission Viejo, California, the son of Denise and Robert Mead. He has two sisters, Lauren and Candice Mead.

Career
Mead began acting at the age of 2, playing minor characters. His first noted achievement was when he played the part of young Johnny McGowan in the 1994 film Dragonworld. Later that same year, he appeared as Uh-huh in the 1994 feature-film adaptation of The Little Rascals. In 1997, Mead portrayed psychic child Danny Torrance in Stephen King's television adaptation of The Shining.

In 1997, he appeared on Late Night with Conan O'Brien and appeared in a commercial for Pizza Hut. The following year he co-starred with Jonathan Taylor Thomas and Brad Renfro in Disney's Tom and Huck. He also played Howard in Corrina, Corrina with Whoopi Goldberg, Jack Merchant in Hellraiser IV, and Kirk Cameron's youngest brother in the short-lived WB sitcom Kirk.  Mead had spoken parts in The Haunting, based on the Shirley Jackson novel The Haunting of Hill House, Disney's Ariel the Little Mermaid, and 1995's Babe. Mead also provided the voices of Gus Griswold in the Disney animated series Recess and Ned Needlemeyer in Nightmare Ned, as well as the titular character in Disney's Lloyd in Space. He has also reprised his role in The Young and the Restless as Nina's son, starting as Young Phillip and Phillip Chancellor IV. In 2010, he appeared as Tommy Farrell in Mean Parents Suck.

Filmography

Film

Television

Video games

References

External links

1987 births
Living people
People from Mission Viejo, California
American male child actors
American male soap opera actors
American male film actors
American male television actors
American male voice actors
20th-century American male actors
21st-century American male actors